Jonathan Knight, LHD, NWS, is an American painter and artist, born in 1959 in Daytona Beach, FL. Jonathan's mediums are primarily watercolors, oils, pastels and printmaking.

Early life 
Dr. Knight, is a Kansas City based artist, who has been featured in many art publications and is featured on AskArt.com. 

In 1999 Jonathan was honored by the Art Institute of Fort Lauderdale, his alma mater, with a doctorate of humane letters degree (LhD). Knight has also earned degrees in Visual Communications, Advertising and Painting. Knight also studied printmaking at the Kansas City Art Institute.

Early in his career Knight worked as a designer, recruiter and researcher for Hallmark Cards, Inc, in Kansas City. He later worked as Vice President Of Creative for Side Street Greetings.

Currently, Knight is an international and national award-winning fine artist exhibiting annually in numerous national and international juried fine competitions. Knight is also a juror of numerous national and some international competitions. He is featured in a coffee table book titled, "The Creativity of Jonathan Knight A Visual Dialogue". Knight's paintings are in numerous museums, corporate and important private art collections nationally and abroad.

Knight's work has been featured in, or recognized by the following organizations.

Magazines 
 Watercolor
 American Artist Publication (Fall, 1999 issue and Winter, 1995 issue)
 Artist's Magazine
 ARTnews
 American Visions Magazine
 American Art Review
 Flash Art International n ° 225-Italy
 Daytona Beach News Journal
 Décor Magazine
 IRAAA

Newspapers 
 Boca News
 Kansas City Star
 Orlando Sentinel
 Palm Beach Illustrated
 Fort Lauderdale's Westside Gazette

Memberships 
 National Watercolor Society
 Southern Watercolor Society
 Mississippi Watercolor Society
 Georgia Watercolor Society
 San Diego Watercolor Society
 Missouri Watercolor Society
 Kansas Watercolor Society
 Allied Artists of America, New York, NY.

Recognition 
 American Artists Professional League, New York City
 The National Watercolor Society, Los Angeles
 Society of Illustrators, New York City.

Awards 
 Houghton-Mifflin Award, Boston, Massachusetts
 Florida Miniature Art Society, Clearwater, Florida
 Miniature Painters, Sculptors, and Gravers Society, Washington, D.C.
 San Diego Watercolor International Exhibition, San Diego, California.
 2004 Arts in Mississippi Award (Best of Show) in the Grand National Watercolor Exhibition, Jackson, Mississippi
 Best of Show Award in the Arizona Aqueous XIX National Exhibition, Tubac, Arizona
 1998 Best of Show Award in the 5th Annual Miniature Art Show, Casper, Wyoming
 Award of Excellence in the San Diego Watercolor Society International exhibition
 Annual Georgia Miniature Art Society International Exhibition
 1996 William Meyerowitz Memorial Award at the 54th Audubon Artists Exhibition, New York City
 Bellsouth Telecommunications Award from the Grand National Watercolor Exhibition, Mississippi Museum of Art
 Founder's Award from the Southern Watercolor Society's 21st Annual Juried Exhibition, Talladega, Florida
 Top Honors at the Emprise Bank Patron Purchase Award
 Beverly and Dick Hoover Award from the Kansas Watercolor Society's Annual Exhibition

Other 
 Exhibited in the Studio Museum in Harlem – These 2 paintings are included in the book, Black Romantic.
 Appeared in the nationally syndicated television show "Girlfriends.”

References

External links
 www.askart.com
 www.jmknight.com

Living people
Artists from Kansas City, Missouri
Hallmark Cards artists
Year of birth missing (living people)